Guy Whittington (died 1440) was a Member of Parliament for the constituency of Gloucestershire for multiple parliaments from 1420 to 1432.

References 

Members of the Parliament of England for Gloucestershire
English MPs 1420
Year of birth unknown
1440 deaths
English MPs May 1421
English MPs 1427
English MPs 1432